Special Collection may refer to:

Libraries
 Special collections, collections of library materials that require specialized security and user services

Intelligence
Special Collection Service joint U.S. Central Intelligence Agency-National Security Agency program

Music
 Special Collection, compilation album by Anne Murray, 2006 
 Special Collection (Garbage EP), 2002
 20 Hits Special Collection, Vol. 1, greatest hits album by Hank Williams Jr.